Puthuyugam TV is an Indian Tamil-language general entertainment channel based in Chennai, India. It complements its sister channel Puthiya Thalaimurai TV, which was launched on 23 October 2013. It is run by Chennai-based The New Era Media Corporation Chennai Pvt. Ltd., along with Puthiya Thalaimurai magazine. It is owned by the SRM Group of Companies.

Programming

See also
 Natchathira Jannal

References

External links
  

Tamil-language television channels
Television channels and stations established in 2013
2013 establishments in India
Television stations in Chennai